Carlos Fernando Corporán (born January 7, 1984) is a Puerto Rican former professional baseball catcher. He played in Major League Baseball (MLB) for the Milwaukee Brewers, Houston Astros, and Texas Rangers.

Early life
Corporán was born in Hato Rey, Puerto Rico on January 7, 1984. He said that he wanted to play baseball from an early age. "Even at school, when they gave us homework where you had to pick a career, doctor or dentist or whatever, I would choose baseball. My teacher told me, 'That's not a real career.' I said, 'That's what I'm going to do. I'm a baseball player.'" Corporán attended Lake City Community College, where he was converted from a shortstop into a catcher.

Professional career

Milwaukee Brewers
Corporán was drafted by Milwaukee in the 12th round of the 2003 Major League Baseball Draft. In , he played for their Rookie-League Helena Brewers and Arizona Brewers.

He started the  season in Huntsville, but was later promoted to the Triple-A Nashville Sounds. In early 2009, he served as a backup catcher in Nashville before being called up to Milwaukee when backup catcher Mike Rivera sprained his ankle. In his only plate appearance for Milwaukee, he got his first hit in the majors off of shortstop Paul Janish. Corporán returned to Nashville after Rivera returned to playing. After the  season, he filed for free agency.

Arizona Diamondbacks
He was signed to a minor league contract by the Arizona Diamondbacks on December 4, 2009. He also received an invitation to spring training as part of the contract. In 2010, Corporán played for the class AAA Reno Aces of the Pacific Coast League. In 87 games, he hit for a .290 batting average, 12 home runs and 50 runs batted in.

Houston Astros
On June 10, 2011, Corporán was called up by the Houston Astros to replace back-up catcher Robinson Cancel. Corporan was later removed from the 40-man roster, but had his contract purchased again on July 15, 2012.

In 2013, Corporán appeared in a career-high 64 major league games. He hit for a .225 batting average with 7 home runs and 20 RBI.  He was designated for assignment by the Astros on January 19, 2015.

Texas Rangers

On January 21, 2015, Corporán was traded to the Texas Rangers for minor league pitcher Akeem Bostick.  In 33 games for the Rangers, he batted .178/.244/.299, hitting 3 home runs and driving in 15 runs.  His season ended prematurely after suffering a thumb injury in mid-July.  On October 26, 2015, he refused a minor league assignment by the Rangers and instead, opted for free agency.

Tampa Bay Rays
On January 26, 2016, Corporán signed a minor league contract with the New York Yankees, with an invite to spring training.  On April 2, 2016, Corporán was traded to the Tampa Bay Rays in exchange for cash considerations. He was released on May 20, 2016, after the team signed J. P. Arencibia.

Miami Marlins
On May 25, 2016, Corporán signed a minor league contract with the Miami Marlins. He was released on August 1, 2016.

Chicago Cubs
On January 7, 2017, Corporán signed a minor league contract with the Chicago Cubs. He was released on April 29, 2017.

Diablos Rojos del México
On January 23, 2018, Corporán signed with the Diablos Rojos del México of the Mexican Baseball League. He was released on July 2, 2018.

Personal life
Corporán's 16-month-old son died on October 12, 2012. The Astros organization said that Carlos Corporán Jr. had undergone four heart surgeries since his birth in June 2011.  The team released a statement offering its condolences to the Corporán family, calling the boy's battle with serious health issues "an inspiration to so many of us."

See also
 Houston Astros award winners and league leaders
 List of Major League Baseball players from Puerto Rico

References

External links

MiLB.com player profile

1984 births
Living people
Arizona League Brewers players
Beloit Snappers players
Brevard County Manatees players
Criollos de Caguas players
Diablos Rojos del México players
Durham Bulls players
Frisco RoughRiders players
Gigantes de Carolina players
Houston Astros players
Helena Brewers players
Huntsville Stars players
Indios de Mayagüez players
Lake City Timberwolves baseball players
Leones de Ponce players
Liga de Béisbol Profesional Roberto Clemente catchers
Major League Baseball catchers
Major League Baseball players from Puerto Rico
Mexican League baseball catchers
Milwaukee Brewers players
Nashville Sounds players
New Orleans Zephyrs players
Oklahoma City RedHawks players
Puerto Rican expatriate baseball players in Mexico
Reno Aces players
Round Rock Express players
Texas Rangers players
West Virginia Power players